Adriano Silva Morães (born April 20, 1970) is a Brazilian former professional rodeo cowboy who specialized in bull riding. He was one of the leading bull riders in the world from the mid-1990s to 2000s, with two titles at the National Finals Rodeo (NFR) and three Professional Bull Riders (PBR) world titles to his credit. He was inducted into the PBR’s Ring of Honor in 2009 and the Bull Riding Hall of Fame in 2020.

Early years
Morães was born April 20, 1970, on his relatives' farm in Quintana, São Paulo, Brazil, but grew up on the ranch his father managed in Cachoeira Paulista. Moraes says he is of Portuguese, Italian and  African ancestry. "Most of us, we are a big mixture of races", Moraes says, "We have in us the best of every single breed".

He grew up wanting to follow in his father's footsteps, but started riding bulls when he was 15. At age 17, he rode in his first professional rodeo in Brazil, and placed second in his third rodeo. Shortly after this, he quit school to ride bulls full-time.

Career
Morães began his career at small rodeos throughout Brazil, eventually becoming a regular winner on that circuit. After being encouraged by a former PRCA bull riding world champion, Charles Sampson, he set a goal of riding full-time in the United States. 

After winning Brazilian national titles in 1992 and 1993, he moved to the United States in 1994; riding on the Professional Rodeo Cowboys Association (PRCA), Bull Riders Only (BRO) and Professional Bull Riders (PBR) circuits. He immediately emerged as a major star, winning the average at both the Calgary Stampede and the NFR, as well as winning the PBR’s inaugural world championship. Most notably, Moraes became only the third man ever to ride 10 out of 10 bulls at the NFR. The other two being Jim Sharp in 1988 and Norman Curry in 1990. 

Morães would again win the average at the NFR in 1996, and in 1997 was on track to win his second PBR world title until breaking a leg during that summer, forcing Adriano to sit out the rest of the year while Michael Gaffney overtook him for the world title. Morães did become the first man to win a second PBR world title, which he won in 2001. His success on that circuit was instrumental in the expansion of the PBR tour to include events in Brazil. He went on to win a third PBR world title in 2006, narrowly beating fellow Brazilian, Guilherme Marchi, despite severe back problems during the PBR World Finals. Adriano was the first bull rider to win three PBR world championships. In that year, he won an all-time series record of $1.36 million—more than three times as much as any other rider. At the end of the 2006 season, his all-time earnings on the PBR circuit were $3.37 million, also a record. Morães has been honored for his accomplishments with a life-size bronze statue of him on Little Yellow Jacket that stands at the entrance to the new PBR headquarters building in Pueblo, Colorado.

Morães announced in January 2008 that the 2008 Built Ford Tough Series season would be his final season of bull riding. He qualified for his last PBR World Finals in late October/early November 2008. His last ride saw him buck off of a bull named Grey Dog, as Morães failed to qualify for the championship round.

Morães' overall PBR career earnings at career's end total nearly $3.5 million. In 2009, he received the ultimate honor from the PBR, the Ring of Honor. In 2018, Morães was inducted into the Texas Cowboy Hall of Fame. In 2020, he was inducted into the Bull Riding Hall of Fame.

Morães qualified for the PBR World Finals a total of 14 times; 1994 to 1998 and 2000 to 2008, although he did not compete at the 1995 and 1997 World Finals due to season-ending injuries (both of which resulted in a broken leg).

Personal life
Morães and his wife Flávia, married since 1989, have four children (Víctor, Jeremías, António, Pedro) and currently have homes in Tyler, Texas and Cachoeira Paulista. A devout Catholic who lists his favorite book as the Bible and the late Pope John Paul II as a personal idol, he is also a member of the Cancão Nova missionary community in Brazil. He and his wife opened a Canção Nova mission in Texas. He chose to ride only half of the 1998 PBR season in order to participate in a religious mission in Brazil, but nonetheless finished fourteenth in that year's PBR standings, despite suffering another broken leg in the middle of the season.

Notes and references

External links
 Official site
Official PBR site — for information on Morães, go to "Athletes" and then go to "Riders" section and search for "Morães".

1970 births
Living people
Brazilian male equestrians
Brazilian Roman Catholics
Sportspeople from São Paulo (state)
Rodeo in Brazil
Bull riders
Professional Bull Riders: Heroes and Legends
Brazilian people of Portuguese descent
Brazilian people of Italian descent
Brazilian people of African descent
People from Cachoeira Paulista